Sean Nee (born 3 July 1959) is an evolutionary biologist and theoretical ecologist.  He has been a Lecturer at Oxford University and Professor at the University of Edinburgh. He has published scientific research papers with ecologist Robert May, theoretical biologist John Maynard Smith and epidemiologist and novelist Sunetra Gupta.

Selected publications

References

1959 births
Living people
Academics of the University of Oxford
Academics of the University of Edinburgh